Tatinghem is a former commune in the Pas-de-Calais department in northern France. On 1 January 2016, it was merged into the new commune Saint-Martin-lez-Tatinghem.

Geography
Tatinghem is located just 2 miles (3 km) west of Saint-Omer, on the D208 road.

Population

Places of interest
 The church of Saint Jacques, dating from the seventeenth century.
 The eighteenth-century château.

See also
Communes of the Pas-de-Calais department

References

Former communes of Pas-de-Calais